Kristina Fargo is a New Hampshire politician.

Education
Fargo graduated from Maryvale High School. In 1985, Fargo earned a BS in business management from the University at Buffalo.

Career
Fargo worked as an IT professional for Liberty Mutual for 23 years, retiring in 2011. On November 6, 2018, Fargo was elected to the New Hampshire House of Representatives where she represents the Strafford 14 district. She assumed office on December 5, 2018. She is a Democrat.

Personal life
Fargo resides in Dover, New Hampshire. Fargo is married and has two children.

References

Living people
University at Buffalo alumni
People from Dover, New Hampshire
Women state legislators in New Hampshire
Democratic Party members of the New Hampshire House of Representatives
21st-century American politicians
21st-century American women politicians
Year of birth missing (living people)